Carole Anne Ormaca Butler (born June 2, 1936 in Fresno, California) is an American former pair skater who competed with Robin Greiner.  The duo won the gold medal at the United States Figure Skating Championships four straight times, beginning in 1953.  They also placed fourth at the World Figure Skating Championships three times and finished in fifth place at the 1956 Winter Olympic Games.

In 1965, Carole Ormaca Butler was inducted into the Fresno County Athletic Hall of Fame along with her skating partner, Robin Greiner.

Results
(pairs with Robin Greiner)

References

 

1936 births
American female pair skaters
Olympic figure skaters of the United States
Figure skaters at the 1956 Winter Olympics
Living people
Sportspeople from Fresno, California
21st-century American women
20th-century American women